8R may refer to :
 Sol Líneas Aéreas IATA airlines designator
 Guyana aircraft registration code
 A standard consumer print size for photographs. See Standard photographic print sizes.

See also
R8 (disambiguation)